The white-cheeked partridge (Arborophila atrogularis) is a species of partridge in the family Phasianidae, native to Asia.

Distribution and habitat
It is found mainly in Northeast India, northern Myanmar, and northeast Bangladesh, inhabiting dense undergrowth in primary and secondary evergreen forest; this sometimes includes adjacent areas of scrub, bamboo, grassland and cultivated land. In India, the species occurs generally at altitudes below 750 m, but may be found at up to 1,220 m in South-East Asia.

Conservation
The white-cheeked partridge is currently classified as Near Threatened by the IUCN. Population numbers are unknown, but it appears to be scarce now in areas where it was previously reported as common, and is apparently under pressure from habitat loss and hunting.

References

white-cheeked partridge
Birds of Northeast India
Birds of Myanmar
white-cheeked partridge
white-cheeked partridge
Taxonomy articles created by Polbot